Ramón Sosa Acosta is a Paraguayan professional footballer who plays as a winger for Argentine Primera División club Gimasia La Plata and the Paraguay national football team. He has also played for Paraguayan sides Olimpia and River Plate Asunción.

Early life
Ramon Sosa was born in the small Paraguayan town of Maracana. Since he was a child, he has always played football and began his career at the Tembetary club. After a brief stint training with Lanús, he moved to the capital city Asuncion when he joined River Plate Asunción.

Club career

River Plate
Sosa joined the youth setups of  Division Profesional club Club River Plate (Asunción) at an early age. He eventually signed for the senior team in 2020, having a breakout season for the club. He scored his first goal for the club in a 1–1 draw against Club Nacional.
Sosa went on to score 4 goals in 29 league appearances, as well as making two appearances in the Copa Sudamericana against Deportivo Cali, losing both games.

Olimpia
In January 2021, Sosa signed for Olimpia, in a deal reported to be about 800 thousand dollars.
Sosa made his debut for the club in a 1–0 home loss to Club Libertad, playing the full 90 minutes. Sosa was performing well for his new club, with the team finishing second in the Torneo Apertura, and he was attracting attention from clubs such as Brazilian Serie A side Red Bull Bragantino, and even Brazilian giants Flamengo enguired about Sosa after their Copa Libertadores defeat to the Brazilians.
In the 2021 season, Sosa helped Olimpia to the 2021 Copa Paraguay trophy, scoring 2 goals in the competition, including the winner in a 3–2 win against Club Cristobal in the round of 32., as well as winning the Supercopa against bitter rivals Cerro Porteño, although he was an unused substitute in a 3–1 win.

In the entirety of the 2021 season, Sosa made 24 league appearances for Olimpia, scored two league goals. Sosa also made 6 appearances in the Copa Libertadores, scoring one goal.

Gimnasia
In January 2022 Sosa signed for Argentine Primera División team Gimasia La Plata for a reported USD 1.3million on a three-year deal. On the signing, which he had been asking for a while, manager Néstor Gorosito said "Sosa arrives with an enormous projection from Paraguay," he also said that the Paraguayan team were looking at him.
Sosa made his debut for his new club in a 0–0 draw away to Racing Club, receiving a yellow card. Sosa score his first goal for the club from the penalty spot in a 3–0 away win against Platense.
Across the season Sosa scored 6 goals in 39 matches as he became a star player for Gimnasia, helping them back to continental football in qualification for the 2023 Copa Sudamericana.

International career
Sosa never participated for any underage Paraguayan national teams, but in November 2022, he was called up to the senior team for their friendlies against Peru and Colombia, in which he made his debut in a 2-0 loss to Colombia.

Honours

Club
Club Olimpia
Copa Paraguay: 2021

Career Statistics

Club

References

External links

1999 births
Living people
Paraguayan footballers
Association football wingers
Club Olimpia footballers
Club de Gimnasia y Esgrima La Plata footballers
Paraguayan Primera División players
Argentine Primera División players